Drumskinny is the site of a stone circle in the townland of Drumskinny, County Fermanagh, Northern Ireland. With the inclusion of an adjacent cairn and alignment, the stone circle is a State Care Historic Monument in Fermanagh and Omagh district, at grid ref: H 2009 7072. The site was excavated in 1962 and is believed to have built around 2000 BC.

There are also two other townlands in Northern Ireland called Drumskinny: in the civil parish of Clonfeacle in County Tyrone; and in the civil parish of Dromore also in County Tyrone.

See also 
 List of archaeological sites in County Fermanagh
 List of townlands in County Fermanagh

External links 
 Irish Megaliths - Drumskinny Photographs

References 

Archaeological sites in County Fermanagh
Stone circles in Northern Ireland
Townlands of County Fermanagh
Prehistoric sites in Northern Ireland
Fermanagh and Omagh district